The Santa Maria Stakes is an American Grade II Thoroughbred horse race run annually in late May at Santa Anita Park in Arcadia, California.  A race for fillies and mares age four and older, it is contested on Pro-Ride synthetic dirt over a distance of one and one-sixteenth miles (8.5 furlongs).

Since the inaugural running in 1934, the Santa Maria Stakes has been contested at various distances:
 6 furlongs: 1934–1936, 1938–1940
 3 furlongs: 1941
 8 furlongs (1 mile): 1946, 1947, 1952–1953
 7 furlongs: 1954–1956
 8.5 furlongs ( miles): 1957–present

The Santa Maria was run as a handicap from 1952 through 2010 and was raced in two divisions in 1983 and 1984.

There was no race in 1937, nor from 1948 through 1951.

The Santa Maria has been downgraded from a Grade I to a Grade II stakes race.

Records
Speed record: (at current distance of  miles)
 1:40.95 – Exotic Wood (1998) (on natural dirt)

Most wins:
 2 – Gay Style (1975, 1976)
 2 – Star Parade (2004, 2006)

Most wins by a jockey:
 6 – Laffit Pincay, Jr. (1973, 1974, 1979, 1983, 1984, 1985)

Most wins by a trainer:
 5 – Charlie Whittingham (1958, 1972, 1975, 1976, 1978)
 5 – Ron McAnally (1990, 1992, 1993, 1995, 2001)

Most wins by an owner:
 3 – Gary A. Tanaka (2001, 2004, 2006)

Winners

References
 The 2008 Santa Maria Handicap at the NTRA
 Ten Things You Should Know about the Santa Maria Stakes at Hello Race Fans!

Horse races in California
Santa Anita Park
Flat horse races for four-year-old fillies
Graded stakes races in the United States
Mile category horse races for fillies and mares
Recurring events established in 1934